"Don't Break the Heart That Loves You" is an American song written by Benny Davis and Murray Mencher (using the pseudonym Ted Murry). The song was a success for two artists in two different genres: Connie Francis in the pop field in 1962 and Margo Smith as a country version in 1978.

Connie Francis version

Benny Davis and Murray Mencher (1898-1991) became associated with Connie Francis by suggestion of Francis' father, George Franconero. The idea was to combine the skills of Tin Pan Alley veterans Davis and Mencher with the current sound of the day. Francis signed Mencher and Davis as regular composers to her own music publishing company, Francon Music Incorporated. Over the following years, Davis and Mencher wrote further hits for Francis, such as the country ballad The Biggest Sin of All and the theme song for Francis' third movie, Follow The Boys, which she also recorded in French, Italian, Spanish, Japanese, and German. Neither of the songs left a big impact on Billboard'''s Pop Charts, but became notable successes on the Adult Contemporary chart.

Francis recorded "Don't Break the Heart That Loves You" in a 2 November 1961 session which also produced "I'm Falling in Love With You Tonight," "When the Boy in Your Arms (Is the Boy in Your Heart)," "'Baby's First Christmas" (another Davis and Mencher composition), "'Mon Cœur est un Violon," and "Personne au Monde."

The ballad, recorded by Francis in two-part harmony with a spoken bridge, is a plea from a heartbroken lover who is trying to understand why her lover is going out of his way to treat her unkindly.  The song ends with her begging him not to break her heart.

The Billboard Hot 100 dated 31 March 1962 ranked "Don't Break the Heart That Loves You" at No.1, making it Francis' third and final chart-topper.  The Connie Francis recording also went to number one on the easy listening charts.

"Don't Break the Heart That Loves You" charted in the UK in April 1962 without paralleling its US chart impact; rather "Don't Break the Heart That Loves You" became Francis' first single to miss the UK Top 30 with peak position of No.39. The track reached No.1 in New Zealand - where it would be Francis' last hit - and No.18 in Australia.

Following the success in the US, Francis recorded "Don't Break the Heart That Loves You" subsequently also in German ("Tu mir Nicht Weh"), Spanish ("Mi Corazón te Adora"), Japanese (泣かせないでね) and in both regular Italian and the Italian dialect Neapolitan (both as "Un Desiderio Folle"). The Francis version is heard in the sixth episode ("Hagsploitation") of the FX television series Feud in the scene where Jessica Lange as Joan Crawford arrives in Baton Rouge to start filming Hush… Hush, Sweet Charlotte.

Chart performance

Other versions

Margo Smith
In 1977, the ballad was recorded by country singer Margo Smith. Her version — featuring a saxophone solo during the musical bridge but not the recitation of Francis's version — topped the Billboard Hot Country Singles chart in February 1978, and crossed over to the Easy Listening chart peaking at number forty.

Chart performance

Other recordings
"Don't Break the Heart That Loves You" has also been recorded by: 
Arthur Alexander (album You Better Move On/ 1962)
The Lennon Sisters (album #1 Hits Of The 1960s/ 1964)
Tatjana Hubinská ("Vieš, Čo Je Žiaľ" Slovak/ 1965) *Dominic Kirwan (album Unconditional Love''/ 1999).
Guy Lombardo recorded a version that appeared on his 1962, Decca album By Special Request.

References

1962 singles
1978 singles
Connie Francis songs
Margo Smith songs
Billboard Hot 100 number-one singles
Number-one singles in New Zealand
Songs written by Benny Davis
1962 songs
MGM Records singles